Cylapinae is a subfamily of plant bug. Bugs in this group tend to forage actively on fungus covered rotten logs in humid tropical forests.

Overview of genera 
 Adcylapocoris
 Afrobothriomiris
 Afrofulvius
 Afrovannius
 Amapacylapus
 Amberofulvius
 Ambocylapus
 Aragocylapus
 Austrovannius
 Bakeriola
 Bironiella
 Bothriomiris
 Brachyfulvius
 Carvalhoma
 Ceratofulvius
 Comefulvius
 Corcovadocola
 Cylapinus
 Cylapocerus
 Cylapocorella
 Cylapocoris
 Cylapocorisca
 Cylapocoroides
 Cylapofulvius
 Cylapoides
 Cylapomorpha
 Cylapus
 Dashymenia
 Dashymeniella
 Duckecylapus
 Epigonomiris
 Euchilofulvius
 Fulvidius
 Fulviella
 Fulvioaustrus
 Fulvius
 Germarofulvius
 Gulacylapus
 Hemiophthalmocoris
 Howefulvius
 Incafulvius
 Jordanofulvius
 Kanakamiris
 Leprocapsus
 Lygaeoscytus
 Microcylapus
 Microfulvius
 Mimofulvius
 Mycetocylapus
 Oligocoris
 Orasus
 Paracylapus
 Pararhinomiris
 Peltidocylapus
 Peritropella
 Peritropis
 Peritropisca
 Peritropoides
 Phyllocylapus
 Phyllofulvidius
 Phyllofulvius
 Popoviana
 Proamblia
 Punctifulvius
 Rewafulvius
 Rhinocylapidius
 Rhinocylapoides
 Rhinocylapus
 Rhinofulvius
 Rhinomiriella
 Rhinomiridius
 Rhinomiris
 Rhinophrus
 Rhyparochromomiris
 Schizopteromiris
 Schmitzofulvius
 Stysiofulvius
 Sulawesifulvius
 Teratofulvidius
 Teratofulvioides
 Teratofulvius
 Trynocoris
 Tucuruisca
 Umboiella
 Valdasoides
 Valdasus
 Vanniopsis
 Vannius
 Vanniusoides
 Xenocylapidius
 Xenocylapus
 Yamatofulvius
 ?Mangalcoris
 †Ambercylapus
 †Archeofulvius
 †Balticofulvius

References

External links 
 

 
Hemiptera subfamilies